Crenshaw House, also known as Younger House and Clay House, is a historic home located in Richmond, Virginia.  It was built in 1891, and is a three-story, Victorian Italianate style brick townhouse. The house was altered by the architectural firm of Noland and Baskervill in 1904.  It features a flat roof decorated with a Doric entablature and copper cresting, a full height three-sided bay window, and an entry porch supported by paired Doric order columns. At two meetings in November 1909, a group of women met at the home to form what would become the Equal Suffrage League of Virginia (ESL).

It was listed on the National Register of Historic Places in 2010.  It is located in the West Franklin Street Historic District.

References

Houses on the National Register of Historic Places in Virginia
Italianate architecture in Virginia
Houses completed in 1891
Houses in Richmond, Virginia
National Register of Historic Places in Richmond, Virginia
Historic district contributing properties in Virginia